The Women's 500m time trial event at the 2010 South American Games was held on March 21.

Medalists

Results

References
Report

500W
Women's time trial (track cycling)